Emmanouil Zymvrakakis (1856–1931) was a Cretan officer of the Greek Gendarmerie.

The son of Major General Ioannis Zymvrakakis, he joined the Gendarmerie, advancing through the ranks to Major General. A staunch Venizelist, he served as chief of the Athens police and later as Commanding General of the Gendarmerie before retiring with a promotion to the rank of Lieutenant General in 1921. In the 1923 elections he was elected an MP for Athens-Piraeus. 

He died at his home in Kifissia in 1931.

1856 births
1931 deaths
Hellenic Gendarmerie generals
Greek MPs 1924–1925